"Cruising for Bruising" is a song by Polish singer Basia released in 1990 as the second single from her album London Warsaw New York. The song remains one of her biggest hits to date.

Background
The track was written and produced by Basia Trzetrzelewska and Danny White, and tells about the breakup of their romantic relationship. The lyrics indicate that the split is not definitive and do not rule out giving the relationship a second chance.

"Cruising for Bruising" was released as the second single from London Warsaw New York in spring 1990 becoming one of Basia's most popular and commercially successful songs. It reached the Top 40 in both the USA and Canada, where it stayed in the charts for twelve and fourteen weeks, respectively. The single also enjoyed minor success in Europe. It received a positive review from the Music & Media magazine, where it was described as one of the better tracks from London Warsaw New York.

Music video
The music video for the song was directed by Nick Morris and filmed in a countryside in Oxfordshire, England since Basia wanted to make it "very English". It pictures Basia and Danny as a couple in the final moments of their failed relationship. The clip begins with Danny arriving at their home where he starts to pack his belongings into a suitcase. He leaves after dusk, giving Basia one last hug outside the house, and drives off accompanied by another woman. Moments after his departure, Basia's new partner arrives and embraces her.

Basia has revealed that during the shooting of the video her make-up had to be repeatedly redone because the song "was so close to the bone" that she was crying on the set.

The clip was released on the 1990 VHS video compilation A New Day. In 2009, the video was released on a bonus DVD included in the special edition of Basia's album It's That Girl Again.

Track listings

7" single/CD single/Cassette single
A. "Cruising for Bruising" – 4:05
B. "Come to Heaven" – 4:08

12" single
A. "Cruising for Bruising" (Extended Mix) – 6:45
B. "Come to Heaven" – 4:08

CD maxi single
 "Cruising for Bruising" – 4:08
 "Cruising for Bruising" (Instrumental) – 4:09
 "Cruising for Bruising" (Extended Version) – 6:16
 "From Now On" – 3:43

Charts

Weekly charts

Year-end charts

References

External links
 The official Basia website

1990 singles
1990 songs
Basia songs
Epic Records singles
Songs written by Danny White (musician)
Songs written by Basia